Charles Douglas "Chuck" Cecil (born November 8, 1964) is an American football coach and former player in the National Football League (NFL). He is currently the safeties coach at the University of Arizona in Tucson, his alma mater. He previously served as a defensive assistant for the Tennessee Titans and Los Angeles Rams. Cecil also spent two seasons (1999–2000) as a television analyst for University of Arizona football games. As a player, he was a Pro Bowl safety.

Early years

Playing career

College
Cecil attended the University of Arizona, where he walked-on for the Wildcats.  He proved the recruiters wrong by eventually earning consensus All-America and Pacific-10 Conference Defensive Player of the Year honors after his nine-interception senior season in 1987.  He held the Pac-10 record for career interceptions, with 21 (Lamont Thompson later broke the mark with 24), and set the Wildcats' school single-game record (and tied the Pac-10 record) with four interceptions against Stanford in 1987.

In the 1986 rivalry game against fourth-ranked Arizona State  Cecil returned an interception 105 yards for a  Wildcats victory in Tucson.  This play has been voted the greatest play in Wildcat football history. 

Cecil was inducted into the Wildcats' Sports Hall of Fame in 1993 and into the College Football Hall of Fame in 2009.

Professional
Selected by the Green Bay Packers in the fourth round of the 1988 NFL Draft (89th overall), Cecil was known for his thunderous tackling and aggressive style during his time as a safety for the Packers (1988–1992), Cardinals (1993), and Oilers (1995). He earned a trip to the Pro Bowl and garnered All-Madden status in 1992 when he recorded four interceptions and 102 tackles on the season. In 95 career games he totaled 400 tackles and 16 interceptions. During his years with the Packers, he earned the nickname "Scud" Cecil due to his hit-or-miss approach to tackling opponents. He often left his feet and led with his helmet, and much like the infamous missiles launched during the Gulf War – would occasionally miss completely or arrive late.

Cecil is regarded as among the most vicious hitters in National Football League history. He was featured on the cover of Sports Illustrated in 1993 (October 11 issue) with the question: "Is Chuck Cecil Too Vicious for the NFL?"  Many photos taken of Cecil during games showed him with a bloodied nose.

During much of his career, Cecil was forced to wear a "Gazoo Helmet"; a helmet so named because it resembled the head of The Great Gazoo, a recurring character in The Flintstones animated series.  The "Gazoo helmet" is actually a thick padding that fits on a helmet's shell to reduce the risk of receiving a concussion and reducing the risk of injury to opponents due to helmet-first hits, for which Cecil was fined numerous times. Despite the additional protection, recurring concussions forced him into retirement.

Coaching career
In 2001, Cecil accepted a coaching position for the Tennessee Titans under Jeff Fisher, for whom he had played in his final season (when the team was the Houston Oilers).  Cecil served as a defensive quality control assistant for three seasons.  He was promoted in 2004, to work with the safeties and nickel backs.  His responsibilities expanded in 2007 to cover all of the defensive backs.

On February 12, 2009, Cecil was named the Titans' defensive coordinator, replacing the departed Jim Schwartz, who had taken the position of Head Coach for the Detroit Lions.

On October 3, 2010, during a game against the Denver Broncos, Cecil gave NFL officials the middle-finger gesture in an attempt to protest a neutral zone infraction call against one of his players. Live close-up video of Cecil was being aired at the time, and the gesture was broadcast without editing. For his inappropriate action, he was fined $40,000 by the league.

On January 20, 2011, it was announced that Cecil would not be retained as the Titans' defensive coordinator.  He was informed of this decision on January 18.  The Titans ranked 26th in total yards allowed and 29th against the pass in the 2010 season.

On February 16, 2011, ESPN.com reported that Cecil would interview with the Pittsburgh Steelers to be their next secondary coach.  He was to fill the void left by Ray Horton when he departed to become the defensive coordinator of the Arizona Cardinals. On February 13, 2012, he was hired as the St. Louis Rams defensive secondary coach.

Return to college
Cecil was hired as a special advisor at University of Arizona on July 28, 2017 at his alma mater. Cecil became interim defensive coordinator for a first time on November 2, 2019, when Arizona parted ways with defensive coordinator Marcel Yates. On December 30, 2020, Cecil was to join Jedd Fisch's coaching staff as safeties coach.

Personal life
Cecil is married to author, columnist and television producer, Carrie Gerlach Cecil. They have one daughter, Charli.

References

External links
University of Arizona Athletics – Chuck Cecil

1964 births
Living people
All-American college football players
American football safeties
Arizona Cardinals players
Arizona Wildcats football players
Arizona Wildcats football coaches
College Football Hall of Fame inductees
Green Bay Packers players
Houston Oilers players
National Conference Pro Bowl players
National Football League defensive coordinators
People from Nashville, Tennessee
People from Red Bluff, California
Tennessee Titans coaches
Players of American football from California
St. Louis Rams coaches